The Bilhete de identidade, commonly abbreviated to BI, is the national ID card of Mozambique.

Application 
New applications for a BI require a valid birth certificate and photo. If renewing a BI within six months of expiry a birth certificate is not required, just the old card and new photo. If replacing a lost/stolen/expired BI, a new application must be made and so both a birth certificate and photo are required.

Description 
The BI is a 10.5 cm x 7.2 cm laminated card, embossed with an issuing seal. It is titled with República de Moçambique (English: Republic of Mozambique) with the national seal. 
It includes the following information about the card holder:
Photograph
Finger Print
Identification Number
Full Name
Sex
Nationality
Date of Birth
Place and Date of Issue
Expiration Date
Height
Occupation
Marital Status
Address
Signature

See also
Politics of Mozambique
Mozambican passport

References
Government of Mozambique Website (in Portuguese)
Boletim da República (Government Bulletin) March 2, 1999 (in Portuguese)

Government of Mozambique
Mozambique